Tamale Airport  is an airport serving Tamale, a town in the Northern Region of Ghana. It is the third busiest airport in Ghana, with 217,958 passengers in 2022.

History

Upgrade to international status
The Tamale Airport was temporarily upgraded to the status of an international airport, with all the necessary facilities. It gained international status in December 2008. The facilities put in place include a runway, taxiways, aprons, terminal, modified fire service building, rehabilitation of the tower building, a car park and a VVIP lounge. Others are the provision of offices for the Customs, Excise and Preventive Services (CEPS) and the Immigration Services.
   
The airport received its first international flights during the CAN 2008 African Cup of nations.

2016 hajj pilgrims uplift
In August 2016 Tamale International airport was cleared to uplift pilgrims to Prince Mohammad bin Abdulaziz Airport in Madina in 3 batches of 500 passengers. Flynas air services providers were contracted to uplift the pilgrims using leased Lion Air Boeing 747-400 jets.

Airlines and destinations

Passenger

Statistics 
These data show number of passengers movements into the airport, according to the Ghana Civil Aviation Authority.

Accidents and incidents

 On 16 August 2013, an Antrak Air ATR 72 from Tamale to Accra made an emergency landing back at Tamale after the crew received a fire indication warning for the left engine. No injuries were reported.
 On 6 October 2015, a Starbow BAe 146-300 (9G-SBB) from Accra to Tamale overran the end of runway 23 on landing resulting in the collapse of the nose gear. There were no major injuries, but the aircraft sustained significant damage and was written off.

Gallery

See also
Tamale sports stadium

References

External links
 
 

Airports in Ghana
Tamale, Ghana
Dagbon